Behind Closed Doors is a 1973 album by Charlie Rich. The album received the Country Music Association award for Album of the Year; the title track (written by Kenny O'Dell) was also named CMA's Single of the Year, and Rich was named Best Male Vocalist for his performance on the album. Rich won the 1974 Grammy Award for Best Male Country Vocal Performance and also took home four Academy of Country Music awards for this album. In 2006, CMT ranked "Behind Closed Doors" No. 37 on its list of the 40 greatest albums in country music.

In 2002, the album was certified Quadruple Platinum by the RIAA, commemorating U.S. sales of over four million.  Charlie Rich contributed "Peace On You" to this album.  Charlie's wife Margaret Ann contributed two of her songs to the album as well, "A Sunday Kind of Woman" and "Nothing In The World (To Do With Me)".  Charlie's teenage son contributed the song "You Never Really Wanted Me" to the album as well.

Track listing 
 "Behind Closed Doors" (Kenny O'Dell) - 2:56
 "If You Wouldn't Be My Lady" (Jimmy Holiday, Eddie Reeves) - 2:53
 "You Never Really Wanted Me" (Allan Rich) - 2:27
 "A Sunday Kind of Woman" (Margaret Ann Rich) - 3:09
 "Peace On You" (Charlie Rich) - 3:59
 "The Most Beautiful Girl" (Billy Sherrill, Norro Wilson, Rory Bourke) - 2:43
 "I Take It On Home" (Kenny O'Dell) - 2:52
 "'Til I Can't Take It Anymore" (Clyde Otis, Dorian Burton) - 2:30
 "We Love Each Other" (Buddy Killen) - 3:08
 "I'm Not Going Hungry Anymore" (Freddie Hart) - 2:12
 "Nothing In the World (To Do With Me)" (Margaret Ann Rich) - 2:41

Charts

Weekly charts

Year-end charts

Personnel
Charlie Rich - vocals
Billy Sanford, Dale Sellers, Harold Bradley, Jerry Kennedy, Ray Edenton - guitar
Pete Drake, Lloyd Green - steel guitar
Bob Moore - bass
Hargus "Pig" Robbins - piano
Buddy Harman, Kenny Buttrey - drums
The Jordanaires, Nashville Edition - background vocals
Technical
Charlie Bragg, Lou Bradley - engineers
Bill Barnes, Peggy Owens - photography

References 

1973 albums
Charlie Rich albums
Albums produced by Billy Sherrill
Epic Records albums